Jolly Days is an Indian 2009 Kannada-language film directed by M. D. Sridhar and produced by Madireddy Param under Young Dream Productions. The film featured mostly newcomers in lead roles including Pradeep, Aishwarya Nag, Vishwas, Praveen Tej and others. The music was scored by Mickey J. Meyer. It is a remake of the 2007 Telugu movie Happy Days. It was released in India on 23 January 2009 and became a hit.

Plot
The story is about four pairs of engineering students and  their activities in college campus and their hostel stories including ragging, teasing, gaming and their love interests.

Cast
 Pradeep as Santhosh "Santhu"
 Aishwarya Nag as "Ankita"
 Vishwas as "Vishwas"
 Spoorthi as Apoorva "Appu"
 Niranjan Shetty as Niranjan "Tyson"
 Ruthuva as Shravanti "Shras"
 Praveen Tej as Praveen
 Keerthi as Keerthi
 Suchendra Prasad as College Principal
 Ruthika as English lecturer
 Vijayasarathi as Faculty member
 Kishori Ballal as Ankita's grandmother
 Hanumanthegowda as Vishwas father

Soundtrack

The official soundtrack contains seven songs, tuned by Mickey J. Meyer with all the tunes reprising from his own Telugu Happy Days. All the lyrics were penned by Kaviraj.

References

External links

Films shot in Karnataka
Films set in Karnataka
Films scored by Mickey J Meyer
2000s Kannada-language films